

Chronology of the 21st century in poetry

2020s 

 2021 in poetry

 2020 in poetry - Lana Del Rey's Violet Bent Backwards Over the Grass

2010s 

 2019 in poetry
 2018 in poetry
 2017 in poetry
 2016 in poetry
 2015 in poetry
 2014 in poetry Death of Madeline Gins, Amiri Baraka, Juan Gelman, José Emilio Pacheco, Maya Angelou
 2013 in poetry Death of Thomas McEvilley, Taylor Mead, Seamus Heaney
 2012 in poetry Günter Grass's poem "What Must Be Said" leads to him being declared persona non grata; Death of Adrienne Rich, Wisława Szymborska
 2011 in poetry Tomas Tranströmer awarded the Nobel Prize in Literature; Liz Lochhead succeeds Edwin Morgan as The Scots Makar; Death of Josephine Hart, Václav Havel, Robert Kroetsch
 2010 in poetry Seamus Heaney's Human Chain; Death of Tuli Kupferberg, Peter Orlovsky, P. Lal, Edwin Morgan

2000s 
 2009 in poetry Turkish government posthumously restores Nâzım Hikmet's citizenship, stripped from him because of his political views; Ruth Padel the first woman elected Oxford Professor of Poetry, only to resign in controversy before taking office; Carol Ann Duffy succeeds Andrew Motion as the UK's Poet Laureate; Elizabeth Alexander reads "Praise Song for the Day" at presidential inauguration of U.S. President Barack Obama; Death of Dennis Brutus, Jim Carroll, Nicholas Hughes (son of Ted Hughes and Sylvia Plath)
 2008 in poetry Death of Harold Pinter, Jonathan Williams
 2007 in poetry Death of William Morris Meredith, Jr., Emmett Williams
 2006 in poetry Seamus Heaney's District and Circle; Death of Stanley Kunitz
 2005 in poetry Harold Pinter awarded the Nobel Prize in Literature; Death of Philip Lamantia, Robert Creeley
 2004 in poetry Seamus Heaney reads "Beacons of Bealtaine" for 25 leaders of the enlarged European Union; Edwin Morgan named as The Scots Makar; Death of Janet Frame, Jackson Mac Low, Czesław Miłosz
 2003 in poetry John Paul II's Roman Triptych (Meditation); Kenneth Rexroth's  Complete Poems (posthumous)
 2002 in poetry Death of Kenneth Koch
 2001 in poetry Seamus Heaney's Electric Light; First-ever Griffin Poetry Prize in Canada; Death of Gregory Corso
 2000 in poetry Death of Yehuda Amichai, Ahmad Shamlou

 01
Poetry by century